North Dakota Highway 35 (ND 35) is a  north–south state highway in the U.S. state of North Dakota. ND 35's southern terminus is at U.S. Route 2 (US 2) in Michigan, and the northern terminus is at ND 17 west of Adams.

Major intersections

References

035
Transportation in Nelson County, North Dakota
Transportation in Walsh County, North Dakota